Olaf Kölzig (born 6 April 1970) is a South African-born German former professional ice hockey goaltender and current goaltender coach and player development coach for the Washington Capitals of the National Hockey League (NHL). With the exception of eight games with the Tampa Bay Lightning, he played his entire 14-year NHL career with the Capitals.

Nicknamed "Ollie the Goalie," Kölzig was born in South Africa to German parents and grew up in several cities across Canada. His family moved to Union Bay, British Columbia, when he was a teenager. Kölzig never applied for Canadian citizenship, which allowed him to represent Germany internationally. Kölzig ranks among the NHL's top 30 in career saves (15th with 18,233), wins (28th with 303), games (23rd with 719), and minutes (23rd with 41,671).

Playing career

Kölzig played major junior hockey for the New Westminster Bruins and Tri-City Americans of the Western Hockey League (WHL). During his time with the Americans, he had an on-ice fistfight with Portland Winter Hawks goaltender Byron Dafoe, who also settled in the Comox Valley with his family at a young age. The two later became teammates and friendly rivals in the NHL, each serving as the other's best man for their respective weddings. On 29 November 1989, Kölzig scored a goal while playing for Tri-City.

The Capitals selected Kölzig in the 1989 NHL Entry Draft. Kölzig played his first NHL game in the 1989–90 NHL season, but was sent down to the minors where he remained for several years. He spent several years in the American Hockey League (AHL) with the Baltimore Skipjacks, Rochester Americans, and Portland Pirates, and one year with the Hampton Roads Admirals of the East Coast Hockey League (ECHL). In 1994, as a member of the Pirates, he won both the 1994 Jack A. Butterfield Trophy as MVP of the AHL playoffs, and the 1994 Hap Holmes Memorial Award).
 
During the 1995–96 NHL season, the Capitals recalled Kölzig to serve as backup for Jim Carey. When the Capitals acquired Bill Ranford from the Boston Bruins for the 1996–97 NHL season, Kölzig remained as backup. In Washington's first game of the 1997-98 season, Ranford suffered an injury and Kölzig took over. Kölzig played well for the rest of the season, winning a total of 33 games and achieving a 2.20 goals against average. He backstopped the Capitals to the Stanley Cup Finals, being one of only 21 goalies in NHL history to record four shutouts in one postseason. Despite his success, the Capitals were swept in the finals by the defending champions, the Detroit Red Wings.

In 2000, Kölzig won the Vezina Trophy as the NHL's best goalie after going 41–20–11 with a 2.24 GAA and five shutouts. Kölzig also has the distinction of being one of four goaltenders to play a scoreless period during an NHL All-Star Game, which he did in 2000. He also played in the 1998 All-Star Game, in which he made 14 saves on 17 shots. During the 2004–05 NHL lock-out he signed with the German club Eisbären Berlin.

On 11 February 2006, Kölzig signed a two-year, $10.9 million extension with the Capitals. In February 2007, in the midst of a 19–19–5 season, Kölzig tore his medial collateral ligament (MCL). Prior to this injury, Kölzig had missed only 18 games and never more than four in a row.

In February 2008, the Capitals acquired goalie Cristobal Huet, who gradually took over as starting goaltender. Despite this, on 12 March Kölzig became the twenty-third goalie to win 300 games. The Capitals qualified for the playoffs, and Huet started every game in their first round series against the Philadelphia Flyers. The Capitals lost in seven games. A few weeks after their elimination, Kölzig announced he did not intend to return to the team. At the time, he was the last remaining Capital to have worn the original red, white and blue uniform and the blue jersey from 1995.

On 1 July 2008, Kölzig became an unrestricted free agent and signed a $1.5 million, 1-year contract with the Tampa Bay Lightning, where he served as the back-up goalie to Mike Smith. Upon Kölzig's return to D.C. as a member of Tampa Bay, he was loudly cheered and a video in tribute to his time with the Caps was shown. On 28 January 2009, it was announced that Kölzig would miss the rest of the 2008–09 season due to a ruptured biceps tendon in his left arm.

Kölzig was traded to the Toronto Maple Leafs along with Jamie Heward, Andy Rogers and a 4th round pick on 4 March 2009 as part of a trade deadline deal for Richard Petiot. As he was at that time suffering from an injury that would see him out for the rest of the 2008–09 season, the end of which would also see his contract expire, his acquisition from Tampa Bay was largely seen as an effort by Toronto general manager Brian Burke to "buy" the 4th round pick by taking on Kölzig's deadweight salary.

On 23 September 2009, Kölzig announced his retirement from the NHL. Later that year, Kölzig was named to the ECHL Hall of Fame at the 2010 ECHL All-Star Game in Ontario, California.

The Capitals have not issued Kölzig's number 37 since his retirement.

Personal life
In 2005, Kölzig and fellow Tri-City Americans alumnus Stu Barnes became part of an ownership group in their former major junior team, assuring the existence of the Americans in Kennewick, Washington.

Kölzig is known for his service off the ice as well as his accomplishments on the ice. Along with fellow NHLers Byron Dafoe and Scott Mellanby, he founded Athletes Against Autism to raise awareness of autism and encourage more research, as well as the Carson Kolzig Foundation for Youth Autism in honour of his son, who is autistic. Because of his local and national service, he was awarded the NHL's King Clancy Memorial Trophy for humanitarian service in 2006, named one of the 10 Washingtonians of the Year by Washingtonian Magazine in 2000, and one of only four non-Canadian winners to receive the NHL Foundation Player Award. In 2004, the Capitals held a vote for fans to determine the top 30 players in the franchise history to celebrate their 30th season in the league. Kölzig's 2,038 votes led all players.

Kölzig is married with three children. Growing up, Kölzig was a fan of the Toronto Maple Leafs.

International play
Kölzig was also the starting goalie for the German Olympic team at the 1998 Winter Olympics in Nagano, Japan, recording a 1.00 GAA and went 2–0. He played for Germany at the 2004 World Cup of Hockey, and went 0–3 with a 3.34 GAA. Kölzig also started in goal for Germany at the 2006 Winter Olympics in Turin, Italy.

Awards and achievements

As a player
 WHL West Second All-Star Team – 1989
 Jack A. Butterfield Trophy – 1994
 Hap Holmes Memorial Award – 1994 (along with Byron Dafoe)
 NHL All-Star Game – 1998 and 2000
 Vezina Trophy – 2000
 NHL First All-Star Team – 2000
 NHL Foundation Player Award – 2001
 DEL champion – 2004–05
 King Clancy Memorial Trophy – 2006
 One of Ten "Washingtonians of the Year" (from Washingtonian Magazine) – 2000
 ECHL Hall of Fame Inductee, Developmental Player – 2010

As a coach
 Stanley Cup champion – 2018

Washington Capitals records
The records below are amongst goaltenders only.

Career
 Most career games played (711).
 Most career wins (301).
 Most career losses (293).
 Most career ties (86).
 Most career minutes played (41,261).
 Most goals allowed (1,860).
 Most career shutouts (35).
 Most career points scored (17).

Regular season
 Most games played in a season (73 in 2000) (Tied with Braden Holtby).
 Most minutes played in a season (4,371 in 2000).
 Most ties in a season (11 in 2000).

Playoffs
 Most career playoffs shutouts (6).
 Most career playoffs penalty minutes (12).

Career statistics

Regular season and playoffs

International

References

External links
 
 Athletes Against Autism

1970 births
Living people
Abbotsford Falcons players
Autism activists
Baltimore Skipjacks players
Eisbären Berlin players
German ice hockey goaltenders
Hampton Roads Admirals players
Ice hockey players at the 1998 Winter Olympics
Ice hockey players at the 2006 Winter Olympics
King Clancy Memorial Trophy winners
National Hockey League All-Stars
National Hockey League first-round draft picks
New Westminster Bruins players
Olympic ice hockey players of Germany
Portland Pirates players
Rochester Americans players
Sportspeople from Johannesburg
Tampa Bay Lightning players
Tri-City Americans players
Vezina Trophy winners
Washington Capitals coaches
Washington Capitals draft picks
Washington Capitals players